Al-Mu'ayyad fid-din Abu Nasr Hibat Allah b. Abi 'Imran Musa b. Da'ud ash-Shirazi  (c. 1000 CE/390 AH – 1078 CE/470 AH) was an 11th-century Isma'ili scholar, philosopher-poet, preacher and theologian of Persian origin. He served the Fatimid Caliph-Imām al-Mustansir Billah as a Da'i in varying capacities, eventually attaining the highest rank of Bab al-Abwab "The Gate of Gates" and Da'i al-du'at "Chief Missionary" in the Fatimid Da‘wah. In his theological and philosophical writings he brought the Isma'ili spiritual heritage to its pinnacle.

Life

Al-Mu'ayyad was born in Shiraz not later than 387/997 and died in Cairo in 470 AH/1078 AD. He lived during the time of the Fatimid Caliphs Al-Hakim (386–412 AH / 996–1021 AD), Al-Zahir (412–427 AH / 1021–1036 AD) and Al-Mustansir (427–48AH / 1036–1094AD). He was buried in the Dar al-ilm where he had resided, worked and died.

Al-Muayyad's real name was Hibatullah ibn Musa, born in the town of Shiraz, capital of the Fars Province (then Persia, now in modern-day Iran), in the year 1000 CE. His father, Musa ibn Dawud, served under the Fatimid Caliph-Imam al-Hakim bi Amr Allah as the Chief Missionary of the province of Fars, where the Isma'ili mission was active. Al-Muayyad was "contemporary with the changeover from the Buyid to the Saljuq Sultanate under the Abbasid Caliphate, as well as the Arab bedouin Hilalian invasion of North Africa, the Fatimiid encouraged invasion of Baghdad by al-Basasiri, the Battle of Manzikert in Anatolia, the rise of the Sulayhids of Yaman and the advent of the Armnenian General Badr al-Jamali in Egypt".

During the reign of the Fatimid Caliph-Imam al-Zahir li-i'zaz Din Allah, Hibatullah ibn Musa was permitted to take over the da'wah office from his father. His title, Al-Mu'ayyad fi d-Din ('The one aided in religion') was probably accorded to him around this time.

Al-Mu'ayyad was appointed to the Diwan al-insha' (secretariat) in 440 AH / 1048 AD on a monthly salary of 1000 dinars and wrote the religious sermons (al-Majalis) for al-Yazuri (as-Sira 89–90). Al-Mu'ayyad gives us an interesting information about the presence of a Buyid Prince Abu 'Ali in the Fatimid Court (as-Siras 87).

Al-Muayyad (Hibatullah) gradually worked his way up the hierarchy of the da‘wa and was eventually appointed Chief Missionary under the Caliph-Imam al-Mustansir Billah. He was appointed the head of the Academy of Science (Dar al-'Iim, originally been founded by the Caliph al-Hakim in Cairo), which was also the headquarters of the Da'wa and became the residence of al-Mu'ayyad. He directed the Da'wa affairs throughout the Fatimid sphere of influence particularly Persia, Yaman, Bahrayn and Northern and Western India ('Uyun - ms. - fols. 59-63, 65). In this position, he worked teaching missionaries from both inside and outside the Fatimid Empire and composing his theological works until the end of his life in 1078 CE. He founded the dynamic tradition of Fatimid daʿwa ('religious mission') poetry that flourished after him for a thousand years through the succeeding Taiyabi daʿwa and continues to thrive today. His poetry uses a unique form of esoteric tāwīl-based religious symbolism – metaphor, in fact, as manifestation, where what appears to be metaphor is the theological reality of the Imam.

The primary source for details of Al-Mu'ayyad's life are his own memoirs, the Sirat al-Mu'ayyad fi d-Din, which was written in three stages between the years 1051 and 1063 CE. He is also mentioned in the works of Nasir Khusraw, another prominent Isma'ili scholar of the time, who had learned under al-Mu'ayyad. In a poem written in 455/1063 (Diwan, 173–177) Nasir praises al-Mua-yyad as his master (teacher) and refers to him as the "Warden of the Gate" ('Bab'). There are other direct references in Nasir's Diwan (313–314). Al-Mu'ayyad also taught Hassan-i Sabbah.

Works
Majalis ul-Muayyadiyah, written between 450 AH to 470 AH. Comprising eight volumes, each one hundred lectures. It deals with various theological and philosophical questions asked by people of other religions and atheists.
Diwan ul-Muayyad, a collection of poems in praise of the Ismai'ili Imams and the doctrines of their faith
Sirat al-Muayyad fid-Din, his autobiography
Sarah ul-Maad, a treatise on the Day of Resurrection
Al-Eazah watabeer fi Fazle Yoomal Ghadir, a treatise on the Ghadir Khumm incident
Al-Ibteda wal-Inteha ('the Beginning and the End')
Taweel ul-Arwah, a treatise on souls
Mahajul-Ibadah, the method of devotion
Al-Maselet-wal-Jawab ('Questions and Answers')
Buniyad-i ta’wil, Persian translation of Asas al-ta’wil by Al-Qadi al-Nu'man

See also
 Ismailism
 Nasir Khusraw al-Qubadiani
 Imamah (Ismaili doctrine)
 Imamah (Nizari Ismaili doctrine)
 Nizari Ismailis

References

Literature

External links
MOʾAYYAD FI’L-DIN ŠIRĀZI in Encyclopaedia Iranica

Bab al-Abwab
The Institute of Ismaili Studies - Memoirs of a Mission: The Ismaili Scholar, Statesman and Poet, al-Mu’ayyad fi’l-Din al-Shirazi 
A Short sketch of the Life of Syedna Al-Muayyad-Fid-Din Al-Shirazi, Head Missionary of the Ismaili Sect
Al Muayyad fid din al Shirazi Article at Amaana.org
Life and Lectures of Al Muayyad fid-din al Shirazi Majalis-ul Muayyadiya - by Al Muayyad fid-din Shirazi
Ismaili Web Poetry Page 1 - Al Muayyad fid-din Shirazi
Al Muayyad's protege Nasir Khusraw

1000s births
1078 deaths
11th-century people from the Fatimid Caliphate
11th-century Muslim theologians
Islamic philosophers
Iranian Ismailis
11th-century Persian-language writers
People from Shiraz
11th-century philosophers
11th-century Iranian philosophers
Chief missionaries of the Fatimid Caliphate
Scholars from the Fatimid Caliphate
11th-century Ismailis